Weisiger is a German language habitational surname for someone from any of various places called Weissig. Notable people with the name include:

 Daniel Weisiger Adams (1821–1872), Confederate States Army brigadier general
 David A. Weisiger (1818–1899),  Confederate States Army brigadier general
 Reed N. Weisiger (1838–1908), Texas State Senator

References 

German-language surnames
German toponymic surnames